Pseudonebularia willani is a species of sea snail, a marine gastropod mollusk in the miter snail family, Mitridae. It was originally published in 2009 as Mitra willani.

Distribution
This marine species occurs off the Philippines.

References

 Poppe G.T., Tagaro S. & Salisbury R. (2009) New species of Mitridae and Costellariidae from the Philippines. Visaya Suppl. 4: 1-86.

External links
 Fedosov A., Puillandre N., Herrmann M., Kantor Yu., Oliverio M., Dgebuadze P., Modica M.V. & Bouchet P. (2018). The collapse of Mitra: molecular systematics and morphology of the Mitridae (Gastropoda: Neogastropoda). Zoological Journal of the Linnean Society. 183(2): 253-337.

Mitridae
Gastropods described in 2009